Mohamed Juma Basheer Abdulla Ghanem (born 13 December 1973) is a Bahraini former footballer who played as a defender for Bahrain in the 2004 AFC Asian Cup. He played club football for Al-Hala SC, Busaiteen Club and Al-Khor SC.

References 

Living people
Bahraini footballers
Bahrain international footballers
Association football defenders
1973 births
Al Hala SC players
Al-Khor SC players
Busaiteen Club players
2004 AFC Asian Cup players